Free probability is a mathematical theory that studies non-commutative random variables. The "freeness" or free independence property is the analogue of the classical notion of independence, and it is connected with free products.
This theory was initiated by Dan Voiculescu around 1986 in order to attack the free group factors isomorphism problem, an important unsolved problem in the theory of operator algebras. Given a free group on some number of generators, we can consider the von Neumann algebra generated by the group algebra, which is a type II1 factor. The isomorphism problem asks whether these are isomorphic for different numbers of generators. It is not even known if any two free group factors are isomorphic. This is similar to Tarski's free group problem, which asks whether two different non-abelian finitely generated free groups have the same elementary theory.

Later connections to random matrix theory, combinatorics, representations of symmetric groups, large deviations, quantum information theory and other theories were established. Free probability is currently undergoing active research.

Typically the random variables lie in a unital algebra A such as a C*-algebra or a von Neumann algebra. The algebra comes equipped with a noncommutative expectation, a linear functional φ: A → C such that φ(1) = 1. Unital subalgebras A1, ..., Am are then said to be freely independent if the expectation of the product a1...an is zero whenever each aj has zero expectation, lies in an Ak, no adjacent aj's come from the same subalgebra Ak, and n is nonzero. Random variables are freely independent if they generate freely independent unital subalgebras.

One of the goals of free probability (still unaccomplished) was to construct new invariants of von Neumann algebras and free dimension is regarded as a reasonable candidate for such an invariant. The main tool used for the construction of free dimension is free entropy.

The relation of free probability with random matrices is a key reason for the wide use of free probability in other subjects. Voiculescu introduced the concept of freeness around 1983 in an operator algebraic context; at the beginning there was no relation at all with random matrices. This connection was only revealed later in 1991 by Voiculescu; he was motivated by the fact that the limit distribution which he found in his free central limit theorem had appeared before in Wigner's semi-circle law in the random matrix context.

The free cumulant functional (introduced by Roland Speicher) plays a major role in the theory.  It is related to the lattice of noncrossing partitions of the set { 1, ..., n } in the same way in which the classic cumulant functional is related to the lattice of all partitions of that set.

See also 
 Random matrix
 Wigner semicircle distribution
 Circular law
 Free convolution

References

Citations

Sources 

 D.-V. Voiculescu, N. Stammeier, M. Weber (eds.): Free Probability and Operator Algebras, Münster Lectures in Mathematics, EMS, 2016
 James A. Mingo, Roland Speicher: Free Probability and Random Matrices. Fields Institute Monographs, Vol. 35, Springer, New York, 2017.
 A. Nica, R. Speicher: [http://www.cambridge.org/us/catalogue/catalogue.asp?isbn=0521858526 Lectures on the Combinatorics of Free Probability.] Cambridge University Press, 2006, 
 Fumio Hiai and Denis Petz, The Semicircle Law, Free Random Variables, and Entropy, 
 Mitchener, P.D. (2005) Non-Commutative Probability Theory, preprint
 Voiculescu, D. V.; Dykema, K. J.; Nica, A. Free random variables. A noncommutative probability approach to free products with applications to random matrices, operator algebras and harmonic analysis on free groups. CRM Monograph Series, 1. American Mathematical Society, Providence, RI, 1992. 
 Terence Tao, 254A, Notes 5: Free probability (10 February, 2010), course notes for graduate course on "Topics in random matrix theory"
 Roland Speicher: Free Probability Theory, course notes

External links 
 Voiculescu receives NAS award in mathematics — contains a readable description of free probability.
 RMTool — A MATLAB-based free probability calculator.
 Alcatel-Lucent Chair on Flexible Radio Applications of Free Probability to Wireless Communications.
 survey articles of Roland Speicher on free probability.
 blog on free probability
 recorded lectures on free probability

Functional analysis
Exotic probabilities